Tiger Chen (born 3 March 1975) is a Chinese martial artist and actor. Tiger Chen is Yuen Wo Ping's protege and Keanu Reeves's teacher and friend. He was also Uma Thurman's stunt double.

Life

Early life
Tiger Chen was born on 3 March 1975 in Chengdu, Sichuan, where he studied the Chinese martial arts. By age 18, he enrolled into Sichuan Wushu Team. He won the National Youth Martial Arts Competition in China.

At the age of 19, Tiger Chen went to the United States, where he lived in a small wooden shack. He said: "In China, at least you can practice kung fu and attend martial arts competitions, but in the United States, you will find that most of your time in washing the dishes and being a porter." Tiger Chen became a student of Hong Kong martial artist Yuen Woo-ping in 2000s.

Film career
In 1998, Tiger Chen began his film career by holding a post on the fight choreography team as an assistant under Yuen in The Matrix, a science fiction action film starring Keanu Reeves, Laurence Fishburne, Carrie-Anne Moss, Hugo Weaving and Joe Pantoliano. At the same time, he became best friends with Keanu Reeves. Chen also held the post of choreographer in Charlie's Angels (2000), Once in the Life (2000) and Kill Bill: Volume 1 (2003).

Tiger Chen had a minor role as a ronin in The Matrix Reloaded (2003), the second film of the Matrix trilogy. In 2005, he appeared as a martial artist in House of Fury with Anthony Wong, Gillian Chung, Stephen Fung and Charlene Choi.

In 2012, Tiger Chen played the lead role in Kung Fu Man, alongside Vanessa Branch and Jiang Mengjie.

After years in minor and supporting roles, Tiger Chen played the titular character in Man of Tai Chi, opposite the film's director Keanu Reeves, Karen Joy Morris and Yam Tat-wah.

In 2018, Tiger made a special appearance in the Malaysian military film PASKAL: The Movie as a Chinese UN Observer accompanying the Malaysian UN Observers during a mission in Angola.

In 2019, Tiger co-starred with Tony Jaa and Iko Uwais in the film Triple Threat. He also has an uncredited cameo as a Triad assassin in the film John Wick 3: Parabellum.

Works

Film

Awards
 Champion of National Youth Martial Arts Competition
 All Around Champion of San Francisco International Martial Arts Tournament 
 Champion of National Karate (Men's -60 kg)
 World Stunt Awards nominations for Matrix 2

See also
 Zoë Bell, Uma Thurman's other stunt double

References

External links
 
 

Male actors from Chengdu
Living people
Chinese martial artists
Sportspeople from Chengdu
Chinese expatriates in the United States
Chinese male film actors
Chinese male television actors
1975 births
21st-century Chinese male actors